The Catholic Church in French Louisiana was ushered in with the establishment of colonies and forts in Detroit (1701), St. Louis, Mobile (1702), Biloxi, Baton Rouge, and New Orleans (1718).

Single diocese
The French possessions of North America were under the authority of a single diocese, whose seat was in Quebec. The archbishop, named and remunerated by the king, was spiritual head of all New France. With loose religious supervision, the fervor of the population was very weak; Louisianans tended to practice their faith much less than their counterparts in France and Canada. The tithe, a tax by the clergy on the faithful, produced less revenue than in France. The Church nevertheless played an important part in the exploration of French Louisiana; it sent missions, primarily carried out by Jesuits, to convert Native Americans. It also founded schools and hospitals: by 1720, the Ursulines were operating a hospital in New Orleans.

Contact with American tribes
The Church and its missionaries established contact with the Amerindian tribes. Certain missionaries, such as Father Jacques Marquette in the 17th century, took part in exploratory missions. The Jesuits translated collections of prayers into numerous Amerindian languages for the purpose of converting the Native Americans. Sometimes living with the tribes, they could not prevent some syncretism of their practices and beliefs. Sincere and permanent conversions were limited in number; many who received missionary instruction tended to assimilate the Holy Trinity into their belief of "spirits", or rejected it outright.

Religious aims of French expeditions
In the late 17th century, French expeditions, which included sovereign, religious and commercial aims, established a foothold on the Mississippi River and Gulf Coast. With its first settlements, France lay claim to a vast region of North America and set out to establish a commercial empire and French nation stretching from the Gulf of Mexico to Canada.

Extent of Louisiana territory
The French colony of Louisiana originally claimed all the land on both sides of the Mississippi River and north to French territory in Canada.  The following present day states were part of the then vast tract of Louisiana: Louisiana, Mississippi, Arkansas, Oklahoma, Missouri, Kansas, Nebraska, Iowa, Illinois, Indiana, Michigan, Wisconsin, Minnesota, North Dakota, and South Dakota.

Catholic settlement along the Mississippi river
Louisiana's French settlements contributed to further exploration and outposts. They were concentrated along the banks of the Mississippi and its major tributaries, from Louisiana to as far north as the region called the Illinois Country, near Peoria, Illinois and present-day St. Louis, Missouri.

See also

19th century history of the Catholic Church in the United States
20th century history of the Catholic Church in the United States
Catholic Church in the United States
Catholic social activism in the United States
Catholicism and American politics
Ecclesiastical property in the United States
History of Roman Catholicism in the United States
National Museum of Catholic Art and History
Roman Catholicism in the United States

References

French-American culture in Louisiana
Pre-statehood history of Louisiana
New France
History of Catholicism in the United States
History of St. Louis